Ramji Ram was an Indian politician. He was elected to the Lok Sabha, the lower house of the Parliament of India, as a member of the Indian National Congress.

References

External links
Official biographical sketch in Lok Sabha website

India MPs 1967–1970
India MPs 1971–1977
Lok Sabha members from Uttar Pradesh
1931 births
Indian National Congress politicians from Uttar Pradesh